Emden is a village in Logan County, Illinois, United States. The population was 485 at the 2010 census.  The village was named after Emden, Germany due to the large number of residents who immigrated to the area from villages along the River Ems

The first newspaper published in Emden was The Emden Star in 1893.

Geography

Demographics

Per the 2010 United States Census, Emden had 485 people.  Among non-Hispanics this includes 475 White (97.9%), 1 Black (0.2%), 1 Asian (0.2%), & 2 from two or more races.  The Hispanic or Latino population included 6 people (1.2%).

Of the 211 households 28.4% had children under the age of 18 living with them, 54.0% were married couples living together, 5.2% had a female householder with children & no husband present, and 34.6% were non-families. 32.2% of households were one person and 37.9% had someone who was 65 or older.

The age distribution was 76.1% over the age of 18 and 23.7% 65 or older. The median age was 46.3 years. The gender ratio was 47.6% male & 52.4% female.  Among 211 occupied households, 82.5% were owner-occupied & 17.5% were renter-occupied.

At the 2000 census, there were 515 people, 216 households, and 147 families in the village. The racial makeup of the village was 99.03% White, 0.19% Native American, and 0.78% from two or more races.

Of the 216 households 29.6% had children under the age of 18 living with them, 57.4% were married couples living together, 7.9% had a female householder with no husband present, and 31.9% were non-families. 29.2% of households were one person and 19.9% were one person aged 65 or older. The average household size was 2.38 and the average family size was 2.90.

The age distribution was 25.2% under the age of 18, 7.8% from 18 to 24, 24.9% from 25 to 44, 18.1% from 45 to 64, and 24.1% 65 or older. The median age was 40 years. For every 100 females, there were 85.3 males. For every 100 females age 18 and over, there were 85.1 males.

The median household income was $36,776 and the median family income  was $42,206. Males had a median income of $34,375 versus $24,688 for females. The per capita income for the village was $17,082. About 4.8% of families and 6.1% of the population were below the poverty line, including 1.4% of those under age 18 and 11.6% of those age 65 or over.

Attractions
Rail Splitter Wind Farm is centered on the village of Emden.

References

External links
 History of Emden, Illinois
 city-data.com

Villages in Logan County, Illinois
Villages in Illinois
German-American history